Sarah Davis  may refer to:

Sarah A. Bowman, aka Davis, prostitute
Sarah Davis (ice hockey)
Sarah Davis (politician)
Sarah Knox Taylor Davis, daughter of the U.S. president Zachary Taylor

See also
Sara Davis, British businesswoman
Sara Davis Buechner, American pianist and educator